Tommaso Dossi (1678 – 18 July 1730) was an Italian painter of the late-Baroque period, active in Verona. He trained with Giovanni Murari and then with Simone Brentana. He painted an altarpiece of the Virgin and child with San Filippo Neri for the church of the Padre Filippini. He painted a Santa Eurosia for the parish church of Mazzurega.

Sources

1678 births
1730 deaths
17th-century Italian painters
Italian male painters
18th-century Italian painters
Painters from Verona
Italian Baroque painters
18th-century Italian male artists